George Washington Creef House is a historic home located at Manteo, Dare County, North Carolina.  It was built about 1895, and is a two-story, "L"-shaped, frame dwelling with Victorian design elements.

It was listed on the National Register of Historic Places in 1982.

References

Houses on the National Register of Historic Places in North Carolina
Victorian architecture in North Carolina
Houses completed in 1895
Houses in Dare County, North Carolina
National Register of Historic Places in Dare County, North Carolina
Roanoke Island